The American city of Portland, Oregon has been recognized for its pizza culture and establishments.

Culture
The Portland Mercury hosts Pizza Week annually.

In 2021, Eater Portland Alex Frane said Portland underwent a pizzeria "boom" in 2020. He described Portland as "a city bursting with pizza shops new and old" that "seems to have no sign of slowing down", with an "ever-growing roster of new pizza shops". The website's Brooke Jackson-Glidden wrote, "Portland is not a city with hundreds of slice shops; in fact, slice culture has barely survived the pandemic in Portland. Trying to define the city's specific style of pizza would be difficult, outside of thick, multi-grain crusts piled with seasonal vegetables — and still, some of the city's finest pizzerias don't make pies anywhere near that form." She said of comparisons between Portland and other cities: "So, yeah, our pizza is good. If you live in Portland, you probably know that; then again, if you moved here from Manhattan, or Chicago, or New Haven, you may have an overriding sense of nostalgia that keeps you from enjoying the pizza that's here. That's okay — these pizzerias will continue to churn out pies, regardless of who's paying attention."

Recognition
Anthony Falco called Portland the "greatest pizza city" in the U.S. in 2018. In 2021, Modernist Pizza authors Nathan Myhrvold and Francisco Migoya named Portland the country's "best pizza city". Jackson-Glidden wrote in 2021, "Frankly, Portland does have a glut of exceptional pizzerias, with chefs who moved here after working in some of the country's most noteworthy pizzerias and restaurants." She cited Pizza Jerk's Tommy Habetz, who worked for Bobby Flay, and Nostrana's Cathy Whims, who studied under Marcella Hazan, as examples. Jackson-Glidden also noted the accomplishments of Ken Forkish (Ken's Artisan Pizza), who wrote James Beard Foundation Award winning books about making bread and pizza.

Pizzerias

Current 

Notable pizzerias currently operating in Portland include:

 Apizza Scholls (2005)
 Assembly Brewing (2019)
 Atlas Pizza (2014)
 Baby Doll Pizza (2012)
 Bridge City Pizza
 Dimo's Apizza (2020)
 East Glisan Pizza Lounge (2014)
 Escape from New York Pizza (1983)
 Gladstone Street Pizza
 Gracie's Apizza
 Ken's Artisan Pizza (2006)
 Lovely's Fifty Fifty
 Nostrana (2005)
 Old Town Pizza (1974)
 Oven and Shaker
 Paladin Pie (2020)
 Pizza Jerk (2015)
 Pizza Thief (2021)
 Pizzeria Otto
 Red Sauce Pizza (2015)
 Scottie's Pizza Parlor (2015)
 Silver Dollar Pizza

The chains Hot Lips Pizza and Sizzle Pie are also based in the city.

Defunct 

Notable defunct pizzerias include:

 Baby Blue Pizza (2019–2022)
 Handsome Pizza (2012–2022)
 Lonesome's Pizza (2010–2017)
 Organ Grinder Restaurant (1973–1996)
 Roman Candle (2013–2018)

The chain Via Tribunali operated in Portland from 2011 to 2015.

References

Italian-American culture in Portland, Oregon
Pizza in the United States